Morichika may refer to:
 Morichika (TV series), a 2021 Bangladeshi TV series
 Morichika, a 1972 Assamese film
 Chōsokabe Morichika, Japanese samurai
 Kitabatake Morichika, Japanese noble
 Rinnosuke Morichika, fictional character